Boundary cells (also known as border cells or boundary vector cells) are neurons found in the hippocampal formation that respond to the presence of an environmental boundary at a particular distance and direction from an animal. The existence of cells with these firing characteristics were first predicted on the basis of properties of place cells. Boundary cells were subsequently discovered in several regions of the hippocampal formation: the subiculum, presubiculum and entorhinal cortex.

O'Keefe and Burgess had noted that the firing fields of place cells, which characteristically respond only in a circumscribed area of an animal's environment, tended to fire in 'corresponding' locations when the shape and size of the environment was altered. For example, a place cell that fired in the northeastern corner of a rectangular environment might continue to fire in the northeastern corner when the size of the environment was doubled. To explain these observations, the Burgess and O'Keefe groups developed a computational model (Boundary Vector Cell - or BVC - model) of place cells that relied on inputs sensitive to the geometry of the environment to determine where a given place cell would fire in environments of different shapes and sizes. The hypothetical input cells (BVCs) responded to environmental boundaries at particular distances and allocentric directions from the rat.

Separate studies emerging from different research groups identified cells with these characteristics in the subiculum, entorhinal cortex and pre- and para-subiculum where they were described variously as "BVCs", "boundary cells" and "border cells". These terms are somewhat interchangeable; the critical defining functional characteristics of associated with the different labelling schemes are rather arbitrary and any functional differences in cells found in different anatomical regions are not yet fully clear. For example, neurons classified as "border cells" may include some that fire at short range to any environmental boundary (regardless of direction). Additionally, the BVC model predicted the existence of a small proportion of cells with longer range tunings (i.e., firing parallel to, but at some distance from boundaries) and few such cells have been described to date. In general, although the general predictions of the BVC model regarding the existence of geometric boundary sensitive inputs were confirmed by the empirical observations it prompted, the more detailed characteristics such as the distribution of distance and direction tunings remain to be determined.

In medial entorhinal cortex border/boundary cells comprise about 10% of local population, being intermingled with grid cells and head direction cells. During development MEC border cells (and HD cells but not grid cells) show adult-like firing fields as soon as rats are able to freely explore their environment at around 16-18 days old. This suggests HD and border cells, rather than grid cells, provide the first critical spatial input to hippocampal place cells.

See also 
Place cell
Head direction cell
Grid cell
Speed cells

References

External links
Rats know their limits with border cells, Neurophilosophy blog, December 22, 2008.

Hippocampus (brain)